

530001–530100 

|-bgcolor=#f2f2f2
| colspan=4 align=center | 
|}

530101–530200 

|-bgcolor=#f2f2f2
| colspan=4 align=center | 
|}

530201–530300 

|-bgcolor=#f2f2f2
| colspan=4 align=center | 
|}

530301–530400 

|-bgcolor=#f2f2f2
| colspan=4 align=center | 
|}

530401–530500 

|-bgcolor=#f2f2f2
| colspan=4 align=center | 
|}

530501–530600 

|-bgcolor=#f2f2f2
| colspan=4 align=center | 
|}

530601–530700 

|-bgcolor=#f2f2f2
| colspan=4 align=center | 
|}

530701–530800 

|-id=721
| 530721 Isscas ||  || ISSCAS, the 1953-founded Institute of Soil Science of the Chinese Academy of Sciences is the only national institute fully dedicated to research on soil, promoting a sustainable development of agriculture in an ecological environment. || 
|}

530801–530900 

|-bgcolor=#f2f2f2
| colspan=4 align=center | 
|}

530901–531000 

|-bgcolor=#f2f2f2
| colspan=4 align=center | 
|}

References 

530001-531000